Jehiel Howell Halsey (October 7, 1788 – December 5, 1867) was an American lawyer and politician from New York. From 1829 to 1831, he served one term in the  U.S. House of Representatives.

Life
He was the son of Congressman Silas Halsey (1743–1832). Halsey moved to Herkimer County in 1793 with his parents, and settled in what is now the town of Lodi in Seneca County. He attended the common schools. He engaged in agricultural pursuits. He was County Clerk of Seneca County from 1819 to 1821.

Political career 
Halsey was elected as a Jacksonian to the 21st United States Congress, holding office from March 4, 1829, to March 3, 1831. He was Chairman of the Committee on Accounts.

He was member of the New York State Senate (7th D.) from 1832 to 1835, sitting in the 55th through 58th New York State Legislatures.

He was Surrogate of Seneca County from 1837 to 1843, and Town Supervisor of Lodi from 1845 to 1846.

Death 
He died on December 5, 1868 and was buried at the West Lodi Cemetery.

Family 
Congressman Nicoll Halsey (1782–1865) was his brother.

References

1788 births
1867 deaths
New York (state) state senators
People from Southampton (town), New York
People from Lodi, New York
New York (state) state court judges
Town supervisors in New York (state)
Jacksonian members of the United States House of Representatives from New York (state)
Burials in New York (state)
19th-century American politicians
Members of the United States House of Representatives from New York (state)